Red Lodge Airport  is a public use airport located one nautical mile (1.85 km) northwest of the central business district of Red Lodge, a city in Carbon County, Montana, United States. It is owned by the City of Red Lodge and Carbon County. According to the FAA's National Plan of Integrated Airport Systems for 2009–2013, it is categorized as a general aviation airport.

Although many U.S. airports use the same three-letter location identifier for the FAA and IATA, this airport is assigned RED by the FAA but has no designation from the IATA (which assigned RED to Mifflin County Airport in Reedsville, Pennsylvania).

Facilities and aircraft 
It has one runway designated 16/34 with an asphalt surface measuring 4,000 by 75 feet (1,219 x 23 m).

For the 12-month period ending September 20, 2005, the airport had 8,050 aircraft operations, an average of 22 per day: 97% general aviation, 3% air taxi, and <1% military. At that time there were 14 aircraft based at this airport: 86% single-engine and 14% multi-engine.

References

External links 
 Aerial image as of 25 August 1998 from USGS The National Map
 

Airports in Montana
Buildings and structures in Carbon County, Montana
Transportation in Carbon County, Montana